Sandgrovhøi is a mountain on the border of Skjåk Municipality and Lom Municipality in Innlandet county, Norway. The mountain is surrounded by several other notable mountains including Lomseggi, Lendfjellet, and Moldulhøi to the northeast, Storhøi to the southeast, Hesthøi and Hestbrepiggene to the southwest, and Hestdalshøgdi and Tverrfjellet to the northwest.

See also
List of mountains of Norway

References

Skjåk
Lom, Norway
Mountains of Innlandet